Didyr Airport  is a public use airport located near Didyr, Sanguié, Burkina Faso.

See also
List of airports in Burkina Faso

References

External links 
 Airport record for Didyr Airport at Landings.com

Airports in Burkina Faso
Sanguié Province